Grevenknapp is a village in the commune of Boevange-sur-Attert, in western Luxembourg.  , the village had a population of 179. The altitude of Grevenknapp is about 317 meters.

External links
Grevenknapp - (air) photos and map

Mersch (canton)
Villages in Luxembourg